Novoresmekeyevo (Yañı Räsmäkäy) is a rural locality (a village) in Chekmagushevsky District, Bashkortostan, Russia. The population was 4 as of 2010. There is 1 street.

Geography 
Novoresmekeyevo is located 8 km southeast of Chekmagush (the district's administrative centre) by road. Resmekeyevo is the nearest rural locality.

References 

Rural localities in Chekmagushevsky District